Ballykinlar Halt railway station was on the Belfast and County Down Railway which ran from Belfast to Newcastle, County Down in Northern Ireland.

History

It was opened by the Belfast and County Down Railway in October 1914, primarily to service the British Army base at Ballykinlar. The station closed to passengers in 1950, by which time it had been taken over by the Ulster Transport Authority. The earliest mention via the British Newspaper Archive was on 31 October 1914 in the Weekly Telegraph https://www.britishnewspaperarchive.co.uk/viewer/bl/0001531/19141031/111/0008.

References 

 
 
 

Disused railway stations in County Down
Railway stations opened in 1915
Railway stations closed in 1950
1915 establishments in Ireland
1950 disestablishments in Northern Ireland
Railway stations in Northern Ireland opened in the 20th century